Melpomène was a Surveillante class 60-gun first rank frigate of the French Navy.

Career 
Melpomène was commissioned in March 1830, in time to take part in the Invasion of Algiers in 1830, and was decommissioned on 28 October after the events.

The next year, on 7 February, she was recommissioned amidst growing tensions with Portugal, and she took part in the blockade, and the subsequent Battle of the Tagus, under Captain de Rabaudy. Arrived the first French warship, she was also the last to depart.

Fate 
In October 1833, she was again decommissioned, never to serve again. She was condemned in 1845, and used as a masting crane in Toulon under the name Travailleuse from 1865.

Notes, citations, and references 
Notes

Citations

Bibliography

Age of Sail frigates of France
Frigates of the French Navy
Surveillante-class frigates
1828 ships